Eduardo Struvay Jaramillo (born 17 December 1990) is a Colombian professional tennis player. He competes mainly on the ATP Challenger Tour and ITF Futures, both in singles and doubles. He reached his highest ATP singles ranking, No. 231 on 13 February 2013, and his highest ATP doubles ranking, No. 177, on 3 February 2014.

Central American and Caribbean Games

Doubles: 1

Mixed Doubles: 1

ATP Challenger & ITF Futures finals

Singles: 17 (11–6)

Doubles: 16 (6–10)

References

External links
 
 
 

1990 births
Living people
Colombian male tennis players
Tennis players at the 2015 Pan American Games
Central American and Caribbean Games gold medalists for Colombia
South American Games bronze medalists for Colombia
South American Games medalists in tennis
Competitors at the 2018 South American Games
Competitors at the 2014 Central American and Caribbean Games
Competitors at the 2018 Central American and Caribbean Games
Central American and Caribbean Games medalists in tennis
Pan American Games competitors for Colombia
People from Pereira, Colombia
21st-century Colombian people